Wisk'achani (Aymara wisk'acha a rodent, -ni a suffix to indicate ownership, "the one with the viscacha", Hispanicized spelling Viscachani) is a  mountain in the Bolivian Andes. It is located in the La Paz Department, Loayza Province, Malla Municipality, at the border with the Inquisivi Province, Quime Municipality. Wisk'achani is situated south-east of the mountain Wallatani of the Kimsa Crus mountain range and Wallatani Lake. The lakes Muyu Quta (Muyu Khota) and Wiska Quta (Wisca Khota) lie at its feet, south-east of it.

References 

Mountains of La Paz Department (Bolivia)